was a Japanese professional Grand Prix motorcycle road racer and auto racer.

Motorsports career
Born in the Hyōgo Prefecture, Katayama began his Grand Prix career in 1964 with Suzuki. He enjoyed his best season in 1967 when he won two races, including the French Grand Prix held at the challenging Circuit de Charade.  He finished the season in second place behind his Suzuki teammate, Hans-Georg Anscheidt in the 50cc world championship. He also finished the 1967 season in fourth place in the 125cc championship. Katayama won four Grand Prix races in his career.

Katayama would later switch to cars, competing in domestic series mainly as Mazda's factory driver until he retired at the end of 1990. He finished second in the 1983 James Hardie 1000, held at the Mount Panorama Circuit in Bathurst, Australia co-driving with four-time winner Allan Moffat in a factory supported Mazda RX-7. His previous visits to the race were in 1977 when he spectacularly rolled his Mazda RX-3 at Murray's Corner on lap 103, and 1982 where he finished in 6th place again partnering Moffat.

In 1990, Katayama placed 20th overall and won the GTP class in the 1990 24 Hours of Le Mans driving a Mazda 767.

Career Results

Motorcycle Grand Prix results

Complete Bathurst 1000 results

24 Hours of Le Mans results

References

External links
 Katayama 1977 Bathurst crash video

1940 births
2016 deaths
Sportspeople from Hyōgo Prefecture
Japanese motorcycle racers
Japanese racing drivers
50cc World Championship riders
125cc World Championship riders
250cc World Championship riders
24 Hours of Le Mans drivers
World Sportscar Championship drivers

Long Distance Series drivers
Japanese Sportscar Championship drivers
Australian Endurance Championship drivers